The Hispaniolan solenodon (Solenodon paradoxus), also known as the agouta, is a small, furry, shrew-like mammal endemic to the Caribbean island of Hispaniola (in the Dominican Republic and Haiti). Like other solenodons, it is a venomous, insect-eating animal that lives in burrows and is active at night. It is an elusive animal and was only first described in 1833; its numbers are stable in protected forests but it remains the focus of conservation efforts.

Its smaller sister species of the same genus, Marcano's solenodon (S. marconoi) became extinct after European colonization. The Hispaniolan solenodon and the rat-like Hispaniolan hutia live in the same habitats and are the only surviving mammals native to the island.

Discovery
In 1833 the Russian Academy of Sciences received a new specimen from Haiti. Puzzled by the animal, curator Johann Friedrich von Brandt named it Solenodon paradoxus. (Solenodon means "grooved teeth".) No more information was known other than a relation to the Cuban solenodon (Atopogale cubana) discovered in 1861, and it was believed to be extinct. Addison Emery Verrill and Alpheus Hyatt Verrill rediscovered the animal in the Dominican Republic in 1907, but by 1964 it was again believed extinct.

Description
 
The Hispaniolan solenodon resembles an oversized shrew; males and females are similar in size. This makes them the largest extant members of the Soricomorpha. Although they are somewhat variable in colour, they are typically dusky brown over most of the body, with a paler underside and reddish fur on the sides of the head, throat, and upper chest. The tail, legs, snout, and eyelids are hairless.

The forelegs are noticeably more developed than the hind legs, but all have strong claws useful for digging. The head is large in relation to its body, with a long rostrum and tiny eyes and ears partially hidden by the body fur. A unique feature is the os proboscidis, a bone extending forward from the nasal opening to support the snout cartilage; this is not found even in other solenodons.

The second lower incisor has a narrow tubular channel that is almost entirely enclosed, through which flows a venomous saliva secreted by the submaxillary gland. Although the exact chemical composition of the venom is unknown, injection of 0.38 to 0.55 mg of venom per gram of body mass has been shown to be fatal to mice in two to six minutes.

Hispaniolan solenodons have patches of skin rich in apocrine glands on the thighs. The secretions of these glands are used in communication between individuals.

Distribution and habitat
Hispaniolan solenodona are found only on the island of Hispaniola, in the Dominican Republic and parts of southern Haiti. Their habitat is usually undisturbed moist forest below  elevation, although they are sometimes found at higher altitudes or close to developed agricultural land. There are two recognised subspecies:

 Solenodon paradoxus paradoxus – northern Dominican Republic
 Solenodon paradoxus woodi – far southern Dominican Republic and Haiti, Tiburon Peninsula

The Hispaniolan solenodon appears to have a patchy distribution. Populations are found both within and outside protected areas such as the Jaragua, Del Este and Sierra de Baoruco National Parks. In Haiti, it is reported from La Visite National Park and the Duchity region of the Massif de la Hotte. Its presence in Los Haitises National Park in the Dominican Republic is inferred, but unconfirmed.

Behavior
Hispaniolan solenodons are nocturnal; during daylight hours, they stay in their burrows, trees, hollowed-out logs or caves, remaining hidden from view. Their burrows may contain multiple chambers and tunnels and are typically inhabited by an adult pair accompanied by up to six younger family members. When they emerge into the open air, they run on the soles of their feet, following an erratic, zigzag course.

Hispaniolan solenodons feed mainly on arthropods, but will also eat worms, snails, mice and small reptiles; they may also feed on a small amount of fruit, grains, and leaf litter. They probe the earth with their snouts and dig or rip open rotten logs with their claws. They have been reported to make a number of vocalisations, including a loud defensive "chirp", an aggressive "squeal", a soft "squeak" when encountering familiar conspecifics, and a high-pitched "clic" when encountering strangers. They have also been reported to make echolocation clicks at 9 to 31 kHz.

Reproduction
Breeding occurs throughout the year, although the females are receptive only for short periods once every ten days or so. Litters of one to three young are born after a gestation period of over 84 days. Usually, only two of the offspring survive, because the female only has two teats, which are found towards the groin. The young are born blind and hairless, and weighing . They are carried about by the mother for the first two months of life, although it is unknown how long it takes for them to be fully weaned. They can live for over eleven years in captivity.

Ecology

The Hispaniolan solenodon is preyed upon by the ashy-faced owl (Tyto glaucops) and the Stygian owl (Asio stygius). Because of a lack of natural land predators, the Hispaniolan solenodon did not evolve defenses, and it is a slow, clumsy runner. Feral dog and cat populations have become established, and small Asian mongooses (Urva auropunctata) were introduced to control rats in sugar cane fields; all three can potentially prey on solenodons.

Evolution
In 2016, researchers at the University of Illinois and the University of Puerto Rico completely sequenced the mitochondrial genome of the Hispaniolan solenodon. The study confirmed that solenodons diverged from all other living mammals about 78 million years ago. The study also found that there is much greater genetic diversity among the northern population than the southern population. This timeline aligns well with a hypothesis on how the Hispaniolan solenodon came to inhabit the island of Hispaniola. Geologists speculate that the island was part of a volcanic arc that connected to Mexico around 75 million years ago.

Conservation
Today, the solenodon is one of the last two surviving native insectivorous mammals found in the Caribbean, and one of the only two remaining endemic terrestrial mammal species of Hispaniola.

While the survival of the solenodon is uncertain, talk of conservation has been underway through the "Last Survivors Project", which has been collaborating with the Dominican government. In 2009, a five-year plan for conservation was funded which has been put in place to conduct field research, discover the best means by which to bring about their conservation, and organize monitoring tools to ensure their long-term survival.

One of the aims of the conservation efforts is to increase local awareness of the species, particularly in the Dominican Republic. The Ornithological Society of Hispaniola showed pictures of the solenodon to the locals in both countries, and few knew what they were due to their nocturnal nature.
The Hispaniolan solenodon was identified as one of the top ten "focal species" in 2007 by the EDGE Species project. A collaborative conservation project funded by the Darwin Initiative (UK) was started in 2009 and is researching the species to conserve it.
The species is fully protected by law. However, national parks in both Haiti and the Dominican Republic are threatened by deforestation and encroachment for farming and charcoal production. The US Agency for International Development and the Nature Conservancy are working with local nongovernmental organisations to improve protection and implement management plans for these parks (the "Parks in Peril" programme). A recovery plan for the isolated Haitian population, published in 1992, advocated comprehensive surveys, improved management of the Pic Macaya National Park, education campaigns, control of exotic mammals, and an ex situ breeding programme. These recommendations have not yet been implemented.

Two conservation research and education programmes funded by the Darwin Initiative have recently been established, focusing on solenodons in both countries: "Building evidence and capacity to conserve Hispaniola's endemic land mammals" (started 2009), and "Building a future for Haiti's unique vertebrates" (started 2010). These collaborative projects represent a partnership between the EDGE Programme, the Durrell Wildlife Conservation Trust, BirdLife International, the Sociedad Ornitologica de la Hispaniola, the Dominican Republic National Zoo, Societe Audubon Haiti, and in-country project partners.

Habitat loss and predation by introduced species have contributed to it being considered an endangered species in the past. It was considered almost extinct until 1907, when it was found living in the interior of Hispaniola. It was not considered to be in immediate danger early in the 20th century. In 1966, it was found in several localities in the Dominican Republic. In 1981, after extensive searching, the Hispaniolan solenodon was declared "functionally extinct" in Haiti, persisting only in the remote mountains of the south. In 1987, it was still found in both countries, but was thought to be particularly threatened in Haiti. As of 1996, it could still be found in both countries. Wildlife filmmaker Jürgen Hoppe has been able to film the Hispaniolan solenodon in various parts of the Dominican Republic during the last 18 years. The most recent sightings in the wild (with video evidence) were during the summer of 2008, when a team of researchers from the Durrell Wildlife Conservation Trust and the Ornithological Society of Hispaniola were able to trap an individual specimen. The researchers took physical measurements and DNA from it before releasing it back into the wild.

Follow up work sequencing the whole genomes of six captured individuals more accurately predicts that solenodons diverged from other extant mammals 73.6 million years ago. Looking at single-nucleotide polymorphism (SNP) variation between northern and southern captured individuals enabled the researchers to infer population demography, which supported a likely subspecies split (S. paradoxus woodi the proposed name for the southern subspecies) within the Hispaniolan solenodon at least 300 thousand years ago.
The solenodon was downlisted from "Endangered" to "Least Concern" by the IUCN in 2020, on the basis of an increased awareness of its population size and range.

References

External links
 
 
  Best photo available on the web.
 
 
 
 
 
 
 

 

Hispaniolan Solenodon
Endemic fauna of Hispaniola
Mammals of Haiti
Mammals of the Dominican Republic
Mammals of the Caribbean
EDGE species
Venomous mammals
Mammals described in 1833